"It Wasn't Me" is the first single from Jamaican-American reggae musician Shaggy's fifth studio album, Hot Shot (2000). The song features vocals from RikRok (credited as Rickardo "RikRok" Ducent). The lyrics of the song depict one man (RikRok) asking his friend (Shaggy) what to do after his girlfriend caught him cheating on her with "the girl next door". His friend's advice is to deny everything, despite clear evidence to the contrary, with the phrase "It wasn't me."

"It Wasn't Me" was released to contemporary hit radio on 7 November 2000 and has been regarded as Shaggy's breakthrough in the pop market. It is his highest-charting song to date, topping the charts in Australia, Flanders, France, Ireland, the Netherlands, Poland, the United Kingdom, and the United States. It was the best-selling single of 2001 in the UK, selling over 1.15 million copies that year and over 1.42 million .

Background
The lyrics of "It Wasn't Me" depict one man asking his friend what to do after his girlfriend catches him having sex with another woman. His friend's advice is to deny everything, despite clear evidence to the contrary, with the phrase "It wasn't me." Ultimately, the narrator says that the advice "makes no sense at all". It is written in the key of C major. 

The song was inspired by a bit called "No Loyal Men," performed by Eddie Murphy in his comedy special Raw (1987). In an interview in February 2016, Shaggy acknowledged similarities with the War song "Smile Happy". The connection is further supported by Liam Payne's debut single of 2017, "Strip That Down", itself based on "It Wasn't Me", which credited both Shaggy (as Orville Burrell) and members of War as co-songwriters.

The clean version of the song replaces the lyric "Picture this: we were both butt-naked banging on the bathroom floor" with "Picture this: we were both caught making love on the bathroom floor" and "Saw me banging on the sofa" with "Saw me kissing on the sofa".

"It Wasn't Me" was originally never intended to be released as a single. Before the original version of Hot Shot was released in August 2000, Hawaiian DJ Pablo Sato downloaded the album from "a Napster like MP3 site he won't name" and discovered that "It Wasn't Me" was "the album's standout cut." He played the song on American radio the next day, and in an interview, claimed, "The phone lines lit up right away. Within a couple of days, it was our number-one requested song." The song was released to radio on 7 November 2000, then was given a retail release on 6 February 2001 following its airplay success.

Chart performance
"It Wasn't Me" was Shaggy's first number one hit in the United States. The song reached number two for two weeks from 16 December to 23 December 2000. On 30 December, it was bumped down one position to number three. It moved back up to the number two spot on 4 January 2001. The song peaked at number one for two weeks in February, unseating Destiny's Child's "Independent Women Part I".

The song also reached number one on the UK Singles Chart on 4 March 2001, selling 345,000 copies, making the song a transatlantic chart topper. It also reached number one in Australia on 1 April 2001. It is also the 11th biggest selling single of the 21st century in the United Kingdom, with sales of over 1.42 million as of September 2017.

As of August 2014, it is the 49th best selling single of the 21st century in France, with 399,500 units sold.

Music video
The music video was directed by Stephen Scott.

It starts out with RikRok running to Shaggy's mansion to explain to him what has just happened. RikRok tells him that he cheated on his girlfriend and got caught. Shaggy tells him to tell her that "It wasn't me." The video then cuts into a flashback to earlier that day. RikRok has been caught sleeping with another woman, and his girlfriend is outside the apartment in her convertible when two women pull up next to her on their sport bikes.

Then, the three women go into the building. He then sneaks out the window, takes the motorcycle of one of his girlfriends accomplices and leaves. The women come out and the girlfriend and one of the accomplices get in the convertible and the other gets on her motorcycle and they chase after him. From his mansion, Shaggy, using his futuristic technology, tracks down where RikRok is going and prepares an escape for him. RikRok then gets on a bridge over the highway when the accomplice rode on the bridge in front of him.

He then hits the brakes to stop while she stops her motorcycle. RikRok then hears a noise behind him and it's the other accomplices and the girlfriend driving the convertible on the other side of the bridge with the highway down below. An eighteen-wheeler drives by, and Shaggy leaves RikRok a text message telling him to look behind and he notices the truck and jumps off the side of overhead and lands on the truck. He is then dropped off at Shaggy's mansion, showing the same scene from the start of the video.

Legacy
The lyrics of "It Wasn't Me" inspired Slate writer Josh Levin to coin the term the "Shaggy defense" to describe R. Kelly's defense at his 2008 child pornography trial stemming from the production of a sex tape: "I predict that in the decades to come, law schools will teach this as the 'Shaggy defense'. You allege that I was caught on camera, butt naked, banging on the log cabin floor? It wasn't me." R. Kelly was ultimately found not guilty on those charges.

Levin repeated the term on NPR, and "Shaggy Defense" entered common use to describe a defendant flatly denying guilt despite overwhelming evidence against them.

The song was spoofed by Bob Rivers, as Caught Me One Handed, and makes a reference to the Scooby-Doo character, Shaggy Rogers. The video focused on him being caught masturbating (about the girl next door) by his mother. The song was also spoofed on Svengoolie. On The Chris Moyles Show, the song was used as a prank call with "Shaggy" (actually impressionist Jon Culshaw) trying to book a taxi, with the final line being "Can you drop me off at The Chris Moyles Show on BBC Radio 1?, 97 to 99 FM".

Track listings

 Jamaican 7-inch single
A. "It Wasn't Me"
B. "It Wasn't Me" (club mix)

 US 7-inch single
A. "It Wasn't Me" (album version) – 3:48
B. "It Wasn't Me" (vocal club) – 4:10

 US CD single
 "It Wasn't Me" (album version)
 "It Wasn't Me" (Squeaky version)
 "It Wasn't Me" (instrumental version)
 "It Wasn't Me" (Sports version)

 US 12-inch single
A1. "It Wasn't Me" (vocal 12-inch mix) – 3:49
A2. "It Wasn't Me" (vocal 12-inch mix instrumental) – 3:49
B1. "It Wasn't Me" (Punch remix) – 3:54
B2. "It Wasn't Me" (album version) – 3:47

 European CD single
 "It Wasn't Me" (radio edit) – 3:43
 "It Wasn't Me" (vocal 12-inch mix) – 3:49

 UK CD single
 "It Wasn't Me" (radio edit) – 3:43
 "It Wasn't Me" (vocal 12-inch mix) – 3:49
 "Dance & Shout" (Pussy 2000 club mix edit) – 8:07
 "It Wasn't Me" (enhanced video)

 UK 12-inch single
A1. "It Wasn't Me" (radio edit) – 3:43
A2. "It Wasn't Me" (album version) – 3:47
B1. "It Wasn't Me" (12-inch vocal) – 3:49

 UK cassette single
 "It Wasn't Me" (radio edit) – 3:43
 "It Wasn't Me" (album version) – 3:47

 Australian CD single
 "It Wasn't Me" (radio edit) – 3:43
 "It Wasn't Me" (vocal 12-inch mix) – 3:49
 "It Wasn't Me" (Crash & Burn remix) – 5:37
 "Dance & Shout" (Pussy 2000 club mix edit) – 8:07
 "Dance & Shout" (Kulb Kings club mix) – 6:30
 "It Wasn't Me" (enhanced video)

Credits and personnel
Credits are taken from the Hot Shot album booklet.

Studios
 Recorded and mixed at Ranch Recording Studios (Valley Stream, New York)
 Mastered at Sterling Sound (New York City)

Personnel

 Shaggy – writing (as Orville Burrell)
 Ricardo "RikRok" Ducent – writing (as Rickardo Ducent)
 Shaun "Sting" Pizzonia – writing, background vocals, drums, production, recording, mixing
 Brian Thompson – writing
 Brian and Tony Gold – background vocals

 Robert Zapata – guitar
 Nigel Staff – keyboard
 Jerry Johnson – brass
 Kevin Batchelor – brass
 Gwen Laster – violin
 Chris Gehringer – mastering

Charts

Weekly charts

Year-end charts

Decade-end charts

All-time charts

Certifications

Release history

See also
 List of Billboard Hot 100 number-one singles of 2001
 List of best-selling singles and albums of 2001 in Ireland
 List of best-selling singles of the 2000s (decade) in the United Kingdom
 List of best-selling singles of the 2000s (century) in the United Kingdom
 List of million-selling singles in the United Kingdom
 List of 2000s UK Singles Chart number ones
 Shaggy defense

References

 The Billboard Book of Number One Hits, fifth edition

External links
 Everything Is A Remix Shaggy is inspired by Eddie Murphy

2000 singles
2000 songs
Billboard Hot 100 number-one singles
Dutch Top 40 number-one singles
European Hot 100 Singles number-one singles
Irish Singles Chart number-one singles
List songs
Masturbation in fiction
Number-one singles in Australia
Number-one singles in Poland
Number-one singles in Scotland
SNEP Top Singles number-one singles
Shaggy (musician) songs
Songs about infidelity
Songs written by Shaggy (musician)
UK Singles Chart number-one singles
Ultratop 50 Singles (Flanders) number-one singles